Rubus densissimus, the Morgantown blackberry, is a rare North American species of flowering plant in the rose family. It grows only in the state of West Virginia in the east-central United States.

The genetics of Rubus is extremely complex, so that it is difficult to decide on which groups should be recognized as species. There are many rare species with limited ranges such as this. Further study is suggested to clarify the taxonomy.

References

External links
photo of herbarium specimen at Missouri Botanical Garden, collected near Morgantown in 1953

densissimus
Plants described in 1942
Flora of West Virginia